Ouled Mansour is a town and commune in M'Sila Province, Algeria. According to the 1998 census it has a population of 4,896.

References

Communes of M'Sila Province
Cities in Algeria
Algeria